"Wasted" is a song by Polish singer Margaret. It was included on her debut studio album, Add the Blonde (2014), and released as its lead single in Poland on 15 January 2014 by Magic Records. On 28 April 2014, the single was released in Scandinavia by Warner Music Sweden and Extensive Music. The song was written by Boris Potemkin, Anthony Whiting, Emily Philips, Robert Uhlmann and Thomas Karlsson. It samples Edita Piekha's 1967 song "Our Neighbour" (Russian: "Наш сосед" nash sosed).

Margaret debuted "Wasted" at the Sylwestrowa Moc Przebojów ("New Year's Eve Power of Hits") concert in Gdynia, Poland on 31 December 2013. The single reached number six on the Polish Airplay Chart.

Music video
The song's music video premiered on Orange Poland website on 14 January 2014, and was uploaded to YouTube on 30 January 2014. The video was directed by Julia Bui Ngoc. It was filmed in Warsaw, and draws inspirations from the Jean-Pierre Jeunet's 2001 film Amélie and the work of Andy Warhol.

Track listing
Digital single
 "Wasted" (Radio Version) – 3:21

Digital single – Remixes
 "Wasted" (Esquire Remix) – 4:43
 "Wasted" (Esquire Radio) – 3:08

Accolades

Charts

Weekly charts

Year-end charts

Release history

References

2014 singles
2014 songs
Margaret (singer) songs
Songs written by Ant Whiting
Songs written by Robert Uhlmann (composer)
Songs with lyrics by Thomas Karlsson
Magic Records singles